The Bagong Henerasyon Party-List, also known as BH Party List is a political organization which has party-list representation in the House of Representatives of the Philippines.

The political party participated in the 2019 Philippine elections, where it secured one seat in the House of Representatives. The seat is currently held by Deputy Speaker Bernadette Herrera-Dy of Quezon City.

Electoral performance

Seats

Representation in Congress

Legislative agenda
The Bagong Henerasyon advocates public service in and out of Congress through livelihood programs. The following are notable accomplishments in its legislative agenda:
 RA 11466 - Salary Standardization Law of 2019 (HB 2027, 2028, and 2029)
 RA 11494 - Bayanihan to Recover As One Act
 RA 11509 - Medical Scholarship and Return Service Program (HB 4315)
 RA 11525 - COVID-19 Vaccination Program Act of 2021
 RA 11534 - Corporate Recovery and Tax Incentives for Enterprises (CREATE)

Advocacies includes gender equality and protection of women and children’s rights, empowering the micro-small and medium enterprises (MSMEs), consumer protection, efficient internet, and economic recovery. Other measures authored are the 105-Day Expanded Maternity Leave Act and the bill banning child marriage in the country.

References

External links
 Bagong Henerasyon on Facebook
 Bagong Henerasyon on Instagram

Party-lists represented in the House of Representatives of the Philippines
2001 establishments in the Philippines
Political parties established in 2001